Aasegobba Meesegobba is a 1990 Indian Kannada-language comedy film, directed by M. S. Rajashekar. The film stars Shiva Rajkumar, Lokesh and Sudha Rani, whilst Raghavendra Rajkumar appears in a cameo. Ambareesh and K. S. Ashwath are in guest roles. The music of the film was composed by Upendra Kumar. The film is a remake of Amol Palekar's 1979 Hindi film Gol Maal. Actress Shruti debuted in this movie by playing Shiva Rajkumar's sister (credited as Priyadarshini).

Plot
A young man gets a job in a company by making the boss believe that he is a man of traditional values. When he is caught for his lies, he tries to wriggle out of the precarious situation.

Cast 
 Shiva Rajkumar as Ram Prasad & Laxman Prasad/Lucky
 Lokesh as Bhavanishankar
 Sudha Rani as Urmila (Bhavanishankar's daughter)
 Shruti (credited as Priyadarshini) as Radha (Ram Prasad's sister)
 Vaishali Kasaravalli as bhavanishankar's sister
 G. V. Shivanand
 Mysore Lokesh
 Honnavalli Krishna
 Mandeep Roy
 Chitra Shenoy
 Nagesh Mayya
 Naveen
 Kunigal Ramanath
 Raghavendra Rajkumar in a cameo
 Ambareesh as himself in a guest role
 K. S. Ashwath as Police Inspector in a guest role

Soundtrack 
All songs were composed by Upendra Kumar

References

External links 
 

1990 films
1990s Kannada-language films
Kannada remakes of Hindi films
Indian comedy films
Films directed by M. S. Rajashekar
Films scored by Upendra Kumar
1990 comedy films